Yehuda Aryeh Leon Bibas (or Judah Bibas) (1789 – April 6, 1852) was a Sephardic rabbi, the rabbi of Corfu and was the first of the precursors of modern Zionism.

Biography

Early life 
Bibas was born in Gibraltar to Sephardi Jews who were descendants of Jews expelled from Spain and had settled in North Africa. One of his maternal ancestors was Chaim ibn Attar. His father came from a line of Rabbis in Tétouan that emigrated to Gibraltar after a pogrom against the Jews that followed the invasion of the city by Spain. Bibas studied as a child in Gibraltar and after the death of his father he moved to Livorno to live with his grandfather. Livorno had a very prestigious and educated Jewish community. Bibas received in Livorno most of his Jewish and secular education, including his title as a physician. He then returned to Gibraltar where he established himself as the Rosh yeshiva. His Yeshiva was attended by students from England, Italy and North Africa. In 1810 he came to London, where he met with the famous Jewish activist and philanthropist Sir Moses Montefiore. Rabbi Yehuda Bibas was fluent in English, Italian, Spanish and Hebrew, and he was also a physician. In 1831, Bibas was appointed as the Chief Rabbi of Corfu.

Zionist activism 
By the years 1839-1840, Bibas undertook a journey in Europe. While visiting many Jewish communities, he called upon the Jews to make Aliyah to Palestine and settle there. He was one of the first Rabbis to do so. In the same year, he met with Judah Alkalai, who became his student. Bibas's plan was to encourage Jews from all over the world to come to Palestine, conquer the land from the Ottomans, and create a Jewish society there. During some of his visits to London, he cooperated with Moses Montefiore on many subjects.

Aliyah and death 
By 1852, one year after his wife died, Bibas made Aliyah to Palestine, and was welcomed by his students in Jaffa. Later he went to Hebron where he established a seminary and built his extensive library. He died two months after his arrival to Palestine and was buried in the Old Jewish Cemetery in Hebron.

Legacy 
The Jewish community of Hebron used to hold a memorial ceremony for him every year on Yom Kippur evening. A street in Jerusalem is named in his memory. In 1953 a professor made the claim that the Dead Sea Scrolls may have come from Bibas's library after having been looted during the 1929 Hebron massacre. In 2022 President Isaac Herzog commemorated Bibas on the 170th anniversary of his passing in a ceremony at the President's Residence calling him "one of the first forerunners of Zionism… his tremendous historical contribution has not received sufficient recognition."

See also 
 Yehuda Bibas article Wikipedia Hebrew
 Proto-Zionism
 Zionism
 Judah Alkalai
 Theodor Herzl

References

External links 
 Judah Bibas on jewishhistory.org.il
 Bibas, Judah - Brill Reference

1789 births
1852 deaths
Forerunners of Zionism
Sephardi rabbis
Gibraltarian Sephardi Jews
People of Moroccan-Jewish descent
Clergy from Corfu
Jewish physicians